The following is a list of the 591 communes of the Meurthe-et-Moselle department of France.

The communes cooperate in the following intercommunalities (as of 2022):
Métropole du Grand Nancy
Communauté d'agglomération Grand Longwy Agglomération
Communauté d'agglomération de Saint-Dié-des-Vosges (partly)
Communauté de communes du Bassin de Pompey
Communauté de communes du Bassin de Pont-à-Mousson
Communauté de communes Cœur du Pays-Haut (partly)
Communauté de communes Mad et Moselle (partly)
Communauté de communes Meurthe, Mortagne, Moselle
Communauté de communes Moselle et Madon
Communauté de communes Orne Lorraine Confluences
Communauté de communes du Pays de Colombey et du Sud Toulois (partly)
Communauté de communes du Pays Haut Val d'Alzette (partly)
Communauté de communes du Pays du Saintois
Communauté de communes du Pays du Sânon
Communauté de communes des Pays du Sel et du Vermois
Communauté de communes de Seille et Grand Couronné
Communauté de communes Terre Lorraine du Longuyonnais
Communauté de communes Terres Touloises
Communauté de communes du Territoire de Lunéville à Baccarat
Communauté de communes de Vezouze en Piémont

References

Meurthe-et-Moselle